The Continued Reformed Churches in the Netherlands or VGKN is a federation of churches founded on 8 May 2004, in the Netherlands.

When the Reformed Church in the Netherlands merged with the Protestant Church in the Netherlands on 1 May 2004, many churches were worried about the new church order. Their main concern was the plurality and different interpretation of the Christian faith.

Churches 
The federation originally consisted of seven churches:
Boornbergum - Kortehemmen
Den Bommel
Frieschepalen - Siegerswoude
Garderen
Haarlem
Harkema
Noordwolde

The Reformed Church in Den Bommel was affiliated to the Protestant Church. The Haarlem Church joined the Netherlands Gereformeerde Kerken in 2005. In May 2006 a new church in Drachtstercompagnie joined the federation.  In 2012 a new congregation joined the Continued Reformed Churches in Boelenslaan. 
The denomination currently has 7 congregations and 2,158 members, the chairman is Rev. Kersten Bijleveld.

References

External links 
  

Reformed denominations in the Netherlands
Christian organizations established in 2008